Alberto Vaquina (born July 4, 1961) is a Mozambican politician who served as  Prime Minister of Mozambique from 2012 to 2015. He was appointed by President Armando Guebuza on 8 October 2012, replacing Aires Ali, who was sacked in a cabinet reshuffle.

Vaquina previously served as Governor of Tete Province from 2010 to 2012.

References

1961 births
FRELIMO politicians
Living people
Prime Ministers of Mozambique